Topsy Küppers (born 17 August 1931) is an Austrian writer, singer, soubrette, actress and former theatre director of German origin.

Life 
Born in Aachen, the foundation stone for Küppers' career as an actress was laid by Ursula Staudte, who taught her according to the so-called Stanislawski principle. However, according to her own statement, the greatest influence was Trude Hesterberg, who taught her the chanson and its interpretation. Küppers then took her exams at the Bühnengenossenschaft, which had Gustaf Gründgens on its board of examiners.

She worked on German stages and for German and Austrian television and from 1958 performed with her then husband Georg Kreisler in Munich, among other places.

In the 25 years that she voluntarily directed the theatre until January 2001, the "headmaster [...] Urwienerin". During this time, she fought against misogyny, anti-Semitism and fascism with musical-literary programmes such as Gehackte Zores, Weit von wo and Amoureuses, Scandaleuses, Heiteres und so Weiteres.

Private life 
In 1965, Küppers took Austrian citizenship.

From her marriage to Georg Kreisler came her daughter , who also works as a singer, speaker and actress, as well as a son. Kreisler and Topsy Küppers separated in the mid-1970s.

Küppers was married in second marriage to Karlheinz (called Carlos) Springer († 2013). In early August 2013, Küppers was diagnosed with colon cancer, which she describes as "my unhappiness" and which she dealt with in the identically titled 2014 book.

Awards
Küppers has received awards at home and abroad for her work, including:
 1967: Trude-Hesterberg-Ring as beste deutschsprachige chansonette
 1976: Goldmedaille beim internationalen Konzertfestiaval Immer wieder Widerstand in Wiesbaden
 1977: Kulturpreis der Stadt Wien
 1984: Goldenes Verdienstzeichen des Landes Wien
 1991:  in Silver
 1992: 
 1992: Bundesverdienstkreuz I. Classe of the Bundesrepublik Deutschland
 1998: Austrian Decoration for Science and Art
 2003: Goldene Emmerich-Kálmán-Medaille in Budapest für die auf Hungarian verfasste Emmerich Kálmán Biography Minden Álom Bésce Vezet (German: Alle Träumen führen nach Wien)
 2011: Österreichisches Ehrenkreuz Wissenschaft und Kunst 1st Classe
 2012: Ehrenbotschafterin der Stadt Aachen
 2012:  (in appreciation of her outstanding artistic achievements)

Discography
 Frivolitäten, LP (1963)
 Gehn ma Tauben vergiften, with Georg Kreisler, LP (1964)
 Die heiße Viertelstunde, with Georg Kreisler, LP (1968)
 Der Tod, das muß ein Wiener sein, with Georg Kreisler, LP/CD (1969/1994)
 Anders als die andern, with Georg Kreisler, LP (1969)
 Heute Abend: Lola Blau, Musical für eine Frau und zwei Klaviere von Georg Kreisler, Doppel-LP/CD (1971/1997)
 Komm… 12 schicke Schlager, LP (1971)
 Immer wieder Widerstand, LP (1973)
 Das Ungeheuer Zärtlichkeit, LP/CD (1974/2001)
 Spiegelbilder, LP (1980)
 Anny macht Moneye,  (1987)
 Lieder nach Lust und Laune, LP (1989)
 Die Zunge der Kultur reicht weit. Lieder and text by Erich Kästner, CD (2007)
 Signale aus dem Jenseits, Gastrolle bei den drei ???, CD (2017)

Books 
 Freie Bühne Wieden. Einführung Topsy Küppers. Graphische Gestaltung Johann Hofmann. Freie Bühne Wieden, Vienna 1977.
 Erwin Brecher: Jedes Wort Gedankensport. Bearbeitet von Topsy Küppers und Elke Browne. htp, Vienna 1995, .
 Lauter liebe Leute. Ein dicker Brief an mein Publikum. Kremayr & Scheriau, Vienna 1996, .
 Alle Träume führen nach Wien. Ein Tatsachenroman. Ibera, Vienna 2001, .
 Wolf Messing. Hellseher und Magier. Langen Müller, Munich 2002, .
 Wenn dein Leben trist ist – erleuchte es mit Humor! Erlebtes – Erhörtes – Erdachtes … Ibera, Vienna 2009, .
 Mein Ungustl. Ein widerlicher Gast. Langen Müller, Munich 2014, .
 Die Brüder Saphir. Ein Tatsachenroman. Verlag Der Apfel, Vienna 2018, .

Filmography 
 1954: Guitars of Love
 1955: Three Girls from the Rhine 
 1955: La Gondola (TV)
 1956: Die wilde Auguste
 1956: 
 1956: Uns gefällt die Welt
 1956: 
 1960: Der Liebesonkel (television recording from the Millowitsch-Theater)
 1961: Paganini (TV)
 1962: Gasparone (TV)
 1963: Berlin-Melodie (tv)
 1969: Ein Abend zu zweit (tv)
 1972: Außenseiter (tv)

 References 

 Further reading 
 
 Topsy Küppers. Schauspielerin und Autorin im Gespräch mit Christoph Lindenmeyer. Transcription from the TV series alpha-Forum: Prominente Persönlichkeiten im Gespräch.'' BR-alpha, 16 May 2003. (as of 20 December 2011: Full text online; PDF, 53,63-KB.)

External links 
 
 
 
 
 
 Topsy Küppers (Facebook)

Austrian film actresses
Austrian stage actresses
20th-century Austrian women singers
Austrian theatre directors
20th-century Austrian writers
Officers Crosses of the Order of Merit of the Federal Republic of Germany
Recipients of the Austrian Cross of Honour for Science and Art, 1st class
1931 births
Living people
People from Aachen